Antti Vikström (born 15 January 1993) is a Finnish archer. He competed in the men's individual event at the 2020 Summer Olympics.

References

External links
 

1993 births
Living people
Finnish male archers
Olympic archers of Finland
Archers at the 2020 Summer Olympics
Place of birth missing (living people)